Western Creek may refer to

Western Creek, Queensland
Western Creek, Tasmania